Andrew Christopher Waller (born 25 September 1959) is a former Zimbabwean cricket player who played two Test matches and 39 One Day Internationals for the Zimbabwe national cricket team. After retiring from the game he took up the post of coach of the Namibian national team.

In April 2009, Waller was named the coaching manager of Zimbabwe Cricket. In September 2009, he was named the head coach of Mid West Rhinos, one of the Zimbabwe's newly introduced five cricket franchises. His son Malcolm Waller plays for the Zimbabwean national team while his nephew, Nathan, represents Mashonaland Eagles.

References

External links
 

1959 births
Living people
Alumni of Falcon College
Cricketers from Harare
White Zimbabwean sportspeople
Mashonaland cricketers
Zimbabwe One Day International cricketers
Zimbabwe Test cricketers
Zimbabwean cricketers
Cricketers at the 1987 Cricket World Cup
Cricketers at the 1992 Cricket World Cup
Cricketers at the 1996 Cricket World Cup
Zimbabwean cricket coaches
Coaches of the Zimbabwe national cricket team